Thangakkili is a 1993 Indian Tamil-language film directed by Rajavarman and produced by A. G. Subramaniam. The film stars Murali, Shaali , Vijayakumar and Janagaraj in lead roles. It was released on 4 June 1993.

Cast
Murali as Raju
Shaali as Swathi
Vijayakumar
Janagaraj
Senthil
Srividya
Charle
Vasu Vikram
Kovai Sarala
Sabitha Anand
Idichapuli Selvaraj
LIC Narasimhan
Kullamani
Master Haja Sheriff
King Kong
R. K. as Raju's friend (uncredited)

Soundtrack
Soundtrack was composed by Ilaiyaraaja.

Reception
Malini Mannath wrote for The Indian Express, "An oft-repeated storyline, clichéd situations, insipid narration and lacklustre performances make Thanga Kili [...] a film to be recommended to one's enemies."

References

External links
 

1993 films
Films scored by Ilaiyaraaja
1990s Tamil-language films